The Irish Council for Social Housing (ICSH) is a national social housing federation representing over 300 housing associations across Ireland. As a representative organisation the ICSH works with statutory and other voluntary organisations to identify and streamline mechanisms to promote social housing in relieving housing need in Ireland through policy development and analysis.

Background
The Irish Council for Social Housing (ICSH) was formed in 1982 by housing and hostel organisations in Ireland to act as a national representative, promotional, information and advisory federation.

Services
Members are involved in the delivery and management of social housing and related services to families on low incomes, homeless people, people with disabilities and the elderly. Over the last decade the sector has grown significantly and the work of housing associations has both intensified and diversified.

As well as being involved in policy issues, the ICSH is committed to assisting members in the provision of social housing and housing related services through the range of services it provides. These services include education and training courses, which are accredited by the National College of Ireland, a group insurance scheme for housing associations, a legal registration service to assist newly formed associations and an advisory service on all aspects of social housing development and management.

Objectives
The main objectives of the ICSH are:
 Promotion of non-profit/Voluntary Housing for the relief of housing need and homelessness. 
 Acting as a representative body for affiliated members. 
 Facilitating the exchange of information amongst members in relation to planning, provision and management of social housing. 
 Provision of information, advice, guidance, education, training and research.

Members
Among the organisation's members are: Society of Saint Vincent de Paul, Irish Wheelchair Association and Sue Ryder Foundation.

References

External links
Irish Council for Social Housing Official site

Housing organisations based in the Republic of Ireland
 
Organizations established in 1982
1982 establishments in Ireland